"Terra Firma" is a song by English indie rock band Young Knives and is featured on their third studio album, Superabundance. The first single taken from the album, it was released on 29 October 2007 and reached a peak position of #43 in the UK Singles Chart.

Track listing

"Terra Firma" – 2:49
"Holiday Everyday"

2007 singles
Transgressive Records singles
2007 songs